was a Japanese professional shogi player who achieved the rank of 8-dan (the highest dan at the time) and also 10-dan, which is an honorary rank, after death. He is a former Meijin and Ninth Dan title holder.

Early life

Shogi professional

Promotion history

Titles and other championships

Tsukada has appeared in major title matches a total of 9 times. He has won the Meijin title twice. He has also won the Ninth Dan title four times with three consecutive wins, which qualified him for the Lifetime Ninth Dan title. (At the time, the highest rank in shogi was 8-dan, and 9-dan was actually a title instead of a permanent rank unlike the ranking system of today.) In addition to major titles, Tsukada has won four other shogi championships during his career.

Major titles

Other championships

Note: Tournaments marked with a cross (†) are no longer held.

Awards and honors

References

External links
 Japan Shogi Association official profile page 

Japanese shogi players
Deceased professional shogi players
Meijin (shogi)
Ninth Dan
Recipients of the Medal with Purple Ribbon
Recipients of the Order of the Rising Sun, 4th class
Professional shogi players from Tokyo
People from Bunkyō
1914 births
1977 deaths
Presidents of the Japan Shogi Association